Arttu-Pekka Aleksi Wiskari (born September 16, 1984) is a Finnish singer-songwriter. Wiskari has attended several Finnish television programs including The Voice Kids, Tähdet tähdet, and Vain elämää. Before full-time musical career, Wiskari has worked in Finnish hardware store RTV.

Wiskari's eponymous debut album was released in June 2011 by Warner Music Finland. The album was certified Platinum (20,000 copies) and it reached the top of the Finnish album chart.

His second album, Tappavan hiljainen rivarinpätkä, was released in April 2013, and it reached number 7 on the album chart.

Wiskari's third album, Sirpaleet, was released in November 2014. It peaked at number six on the album chart. Its second single, "Sirpa" was panned in review by critic of Rumba magazine, who claimed it was "plagiarizing" the Finnish band Leevi and the Leavings. Though more as a figure of speech not actual plagiarism. 

In November 2016, Wiskari released his fourth album titled IV. The album peaked at number fourteen on its debut week.

In November 2018, Wiskari released a single titled "Suomen muotoisen pilven alla". The song peaked at number four on the singles chart and became the most played radio track of 2019.

In April 2020, Wiskari released "Tässäkö tää oli?", a single featuring Leavings-Orkesteri, which was formed by surviving members of the former Leevi and the Leavings. The song debuted at number six.

Discography

Albums

Singles

Filmography

References

External links 
 

1984 births
Living people
Finnish male singer-songwriters
21st-century Finnish male singers
Finnish male film actors
Finnish male voice actors
People from Espoo